Anna Stang (May 18, 1834 – December 23, 1901), née Anna Sophie Margrethe Holmsen, was a Norwegian feminist, liberal politician and the second President of the Norwegian Association for Women's Rights, serving from 1885 to 1886. She also ran a private school in Kongsvinger for 17 years. She was married to Norwegian Prime Minister Jacob Stang, and was therefore for the rest of her life addressed as "Madam Prime Minister". She was the mother of Minister of Defence Georg Stang.

References

Norwegian women's rights activists
1834 births
1901 deaths
Norwegian feminists
Norwegian Association for Women's Rights people
People from Kongsvinger